Darzi Mahalleh (also Romanized as Darzī Maḩalleh) is a village in Machian Rural District, Kelachay District, Rudsar County, Gilan Province, Iran. At the 2006 census, its population was 136, in 41 families.

References 

Populated places in Rudsar County